Litton is a small village and civil parish between Chewton Mendip and West Harptree in the Mendip Hills, Somerset, England. The parish includes the hamlet of Sherborne. Very close to the village are the Litton Reservoirs.

History 

Litton was listed in the Domesday Book of 1086 as Litune, meaning 'The small enclosure' from the Old English lyt and tun. It was the property of Gisa, Bishop of Wells.

The shape of some of the existing fields with cross-slope and down-slope field banks and cultivated ridges forming an interleaving irregular mosaic suggest they are of medieval origin.

The parish was part of the hundred of Wells Forum.

Governance 

The parish council has responsibility for local issues, including setting an annual precept (local rate) to cover the council's operating costs and producing annual accounts for public scrutiny. The parish council evaluates local planning applications and works with the local police, district council officers, and neighbourhood watch groups on matters of crime, security, and traffic. The parish council's role also includes initiating projects for the maintenance and repair of parish facilities, as well as consulting with the district council on the maintenance, repair, and improvement of highways, drainage, footpaths, public transport, and street cleaning. Conservation matters (including trees and listed buildings) and environmental issues are also the responsibility of the council.

Litton is part of the Nedge Ward, which is represented by one councillor on the Non-metropolitan district of Mendip, which was formed on 1 April 1974 under the Local Government Act 1972, having previously been part of Clutton Rural District, which is responsible for local planning and building control, local roads, council housing, environmental health, markets and fairs, refuse collection and recycling, cemeteries and crematoria, leisure services, parks, and tourism.

Somerset County Council is responsible for running the largest and most expensive local services such as education, social services, libraries, main roads, public transport, policing and fire services, trading standards, waste disposal and strategic planning.

It is also part of the Wells county constituency represented in the House of Commons of the Parliament of the United Kingdom. It elects one Member of Parliament (MP) by the first past the post system of election.

Demographics 

According to the 2001 Census, the Nedge Ward (which includes Chewton Mendip), had 2,074 residents, living in 893 households, with an average age of 40.0 years. Of these 78% of residents describing their health as 'good', 18% of 16- to 74-year-olds had no qualifications; and the area had an unemployment rate of 1.8% of all economically active people aged 16–74. In the Index of Multiple Deprivation 2004, it was ranked at 26,803 out of 32,482 wards in England, where 1 was the most deprived LSOA and 32,482 the least deprived.

Church of St Mary 

The Anglican Church of St Mary dates from the 13th century. It has a Perpendicular tower with a bell chamber. It is a Grade I listed building. Several of the memorials and crosses in the churchyard are also listed buildings.

Listed Buildings 

There are a range of other listed buildings in the village including Sherborne House, which is a Grade II listed building, as is Manor Farmhouse, which dates from the early 17th century.

References

External links 

Map of Litton circa 1900

Villages in Mendip District
Mendip Hills
Civil parishes in Somerset